Kjeld Kirk Kristiansen (born 27 December 1947) is the former President and CEO of The Lego Group (1979–2004). According to Bloomberg Billionaires Index, Kristiansen is the third richest Dane, with a net worth of $6.75 billion as of April 2021. He is the grandson of Lego founder Ole Kirk Christiansen.

Biography
Kristiansen was born 27 December 1947 in Billund, Denmark.  His father, Godtfred Kirk Christiansen, worked with his grandfather, Ole Kirk Christiansen, in the family business: Lego.  As a child, he often inspired and tested new model concepts and their building instructions.  He also appeared on many of the company's packages and marketing materials.  In 1979, he became president and CEO of The Lego Group.  Kristiansen introduced themes, minifigures, LEGO.com, Lego Mindstorms and licensed properties.  In 2004, he stepped down as president and CEO to focus on his role as owner of the Lego Group and vice-chairman of the board, while maintaining his role as chairman of the board of KIRKBI A/S, Lego Holding A/S and the Lego Foundation.  Lego is privately held and is controlled by the Kristiansen family and their foundations.

Kristiansen and his wife, Camilla, live in Denmark and have three children: Thomas Kirk Kristiansen, Sofie Kirk Kristiansen, and Agnete Kirk Thinggaard, a Danish Olympic dressage rider.

Kristiansen holds a bachelor's degree from Aarhus University and an MBA from IMD Business School, Switzerland.

Awards
He has received many awards in his professional career.
 Knight 1st Class (Officer) of Denmark's Dannebrog Order
 1996: Distinguished Family Business Award from the International Institute for Management Development (IMD), Switzerland
 Moran (Peony) insignia of the Order of Civil Merit from the Korean government
 Founder's Award from Dean Kamen
 2008: he was inducted in the National Toy Hall of Fame.  The Toy Hall of Fame was established in 1984 to recognize those people who have contributed most significantly to the toy industry.  Past inductees include Ole Kirk Christiansen, Kjeld's grandfather and Lego founder, inducted in 1989.

See also
List of billionaires
 Lego

References

External links
Kjeld Kirk Kristiansen — BrickWiki article

1947 births
Living people
Danish businesspeople
Danish billionaires
Lego people
Moran Medals of the Order of Civil Merit (Korea)
People from Billund Municipality